The Gorgon is a monster in Greek mythology.

Gorgon may also refer to:

Entertainment 
 The Gorgon, a 1964 Hammer Horror film
 The Gorgon (1942 film), an Italian historical drama film
 Gorgon (composition), a composition for orchestra byChristopher Rouse
 Gorgon Video, a video production company and film distributor of dark documentaries and extreme horror films
 Gorgon (comics), two Marvel Comics and two DC Comics characters
 Delphyne Gorgon, a Marvel Comics character
 Archduke Gorgon, a character from the Mazinger series of manga and anime
 Gorgon (video game), a 1981 side-scrolling game for the Apple II
 The Gargons, a species of giant extraterrestrial lobsters from Teenagers from Outer Space

Military

 HMS Gorgon, several ships of the Royal Navy
 Gorgon-class monitor, a First World War Royal Navy monitor class
 Gorgon (U.S. missile), an American missile developed during World War II
 the SH-11 Russian anti-ballistic missile, formerly part of the A-135 anti-ballistic missile system
 Gorgon Stare, a United States military surveillance system

Other uses 
 Gorgon (surname)
 Euryale ferox, the "gorgon plant"
 Gorgon gas project, a resources project in Western Australia
 Gorgoń, Łódź Voivodeship, Poland
 South Devon Railway Gorgon class of locomotives
 An African Gorgon, a mythological creature also known as a Catoblepas
 Gorgon City, an English electronic music production duo

See also
Gorgan, a city in Iran
 Gorgone (disambiguation)
Gorgonopsia, a sub-order of prehistoric mammal-like reptiles
Meandrusa payeni or Yellow Gorgon, a butterfly
Meandrusa sciron or Brown Gorgon, a butterfly
Saint-Gorgon (disambiguation), several communes in France